The Orange League is a high school athletic league that is part of the CIF Southern Section. Members are located around Santa Ana. Despite its name, no members are located in Orange, California.

Members
 Anaheim High School
 Century High School
 Magnolia High School
 Santa Ana Valley High School
 Savanna High School
 Western High School

References

CIF Southern Section leagues